Maniltoa floribunda is a species of plant in the family Fabaceae. It is found only in Fiji.

References

floribunda
Endemic flora of Fiji
Least concern plants
Taxonomy articles created by Polbot
Taxobox binomials not recognized by IUCN